Safar is the second month of Islamic calendar.

Safar may also refer to:

Films
 Safar (1970 film), a 1970 Hindi film
 Safar (2016 film), a 2016 Nepali film

People

Safar
Athanasius Safar, Syriac Catholic bishop of Mardin
Hanne Safar (died 1915), Syriac Orthodox leader in Midyat
Hussain Safar, Kuwaiti judoka
Iuliu Safar, Romanian futsal player
Khvajeh Safar, Safavid official
Peter Safar (1924–2003), Austrian physician and inventor
Selem Safar, Syrian-Argentine basketball player
Yousef Ahmed Safar, Emirati footballer

Sáfár
Szabolcs Sáfár, Hungarian footballer
Stephen Sáfár, Hungarian diplomat
Nicholas Sáfár, Hungarian nobleman

Šafář
Zdeněk Šafář (born 1978), Czech freestyle skier

Places
 Safar, Iran, a village in Jayezan Rural District, Khuzestan Province
 Safar (neighborhood), a neighborhood in Alexandria, Egypt

See also
Saffar
Sfar (disambiguation)